Kim Jung-joo (born 26 September 1991) is a South Korean football player who plays as a forward for South Korean club that K League Challenge side Daejeon Citizen.

Club career

Gangwon FC
On 17 November 2009, Gangwon called him as extra order at 2010 K-League Draft. His first K-League match was against Pohang Steelers in Pohang that Gangwon lose by 0-4 in away game by substitute on 20 March 2010.

Statistics

References

External links
 

1991 births
Living people
Association football midfielders
South Korean footballers
Gangwon FC players
Gangneung City FC players
Daejeon Hana Citizen FC players
K League 1 players
K League 2 players
Korea National League players